Harry Tuchman Levin (July 18, 1912 – May 29, 1994) was an American literary critic and scholar of both modernism and comparative literature.

Life and career
Levin was born in Minneapolis, the son of Beatrice Hirshler (née Tuchman) and Isadore Henry Levin. His family was Jewish. Levin was educated at Harvard University (where he was a contemporary of M. H. Abrams). According to a biographical memoir by Walter Jackson Bate:

After graduating summa cum laude in 1933, he was appointed Junior Fellow in then-new Harvard University Society of Fellows, the university's highest honour bestowed upon graduate students, where he pursued in depth what were to become his three major interests: Shakespeare and the English Renaissance; modern literature generally; and the relation of English and American to other literatures, from Greek and Latin antiquity to the present, all of which are reflected in his early publications, giving him a perspective lacking in the ordinary specialist and scarcely matched in his later years by more than three or four scholars here or abroad. In the 1930s, junior fellows did not normally take a Ph. D., so that Harry, like his noted predecessor, George Lyman Kittredge, remained an A.B., though he was in time to receive six honorary degrees, including ones from Oxford and the Sorbonne, and though he was, over the years, to supervise over ninety doctoral theses.

Levin began teaching at Harvard in 1939 and that same year he married Elena Zarudnaya. He was named Irving Babbitt Professor of Comparative Literature at Harvard in 1960 and retired in 1983. He continued to live near campus in Cambridge, Massachusetts, until his death in 1994. He was survived by his widow Elena and their daughter Marina.

Levin was an elected member of both the American Academy of Arts and Sciences and the American Philosophical Society.

Levin's course in "Comedy on the Stage" inspired Leonard Lehrman to write the paper, "The Threepenny Cradle," comparing the Brecht-Weill Threepenny Opera to Marc Blitzstein's The Cradle Will Rock. In the fall of 1969, in a production of Cradle directed by Lehrman, Levin was the sole patron.  In 1970-1971 he encouraged, advised, and became a patron for two other Harvard productions by Lehrman: the U.S. premiere of Brecht's The Days of the Commune, and a triple-bill in memory of Blitzstein, which was attended by Leonard Bernstein.  It was at that production that Levin invited Bernstein to become Norton Lecturer at Harvard, which he did, a year later.

In 1985, the American Comparative Literature Association began awarding the Harry Levin Prize for books on literary history or criticism and in 1997, Harvard University endowed the new chair (position) of Harry Levin Professor of Literature.

Works
The Broken Column (1931), Harvard undergraduate essay published by Cambridge UP
Ben Jonson, Selected Works (1938) editor
James Joyce: A Critical Introduction (1941)
Toward Stendhal (1945)
The Portable James Joyce (1947) editor
Toward Balzac (1947)
Perspectives of Criticism (1950) editor
The overreacher, a study of Christopher Marlowe (1952)
Symbolism and Fiction (1956)
Contexts of Criticism (1957)
The Power of Blackness: Hawthorne, Poe, Melville (1958)
The Question of Hamlet (1959)
Irving Babbitt and the Teaching of Literature (1960) Inaugural Lecture
The Scarlet Letter and other Tales of the Puritans by Nathaniel Hawthorne (1961) editor
The Gates of Horn: A Study of Five French Realists (1963)
The Comedy of Errors (1965) editor
Refractions: Essays in Comparative Literature (1966)
The Myth of the Golden Age in the Renaissance (1969)
Playboys and Killjoys: An Essay on the Theory and Practice of Comedy (1988)

References

External links
 At Harvard University:
 Guide to the Papers of Harry Levin (with biography)
 At the American Comparative Literature Association:
 The Harry Levin and René Wellek Prizes (given in alternate years)

1912 births
1994 deaths
20th-century American academics
20th-century American biographers
20th-century American essayists
20th-century American historians
20th-century American Jews
20th-century American male writers
20th-century American non-fiction writers
20th-century educators
20th-century scholars
Academics from Massachusetts
Academics from Minnesota
American academics
American academics of English literature
American educators
American literary critics
American literary historians
American literary theorists
American male essayists
American male non-fiction writers
Comparative literature academics
Harvard University alumni
Harvard University faculty
Historians from Massachusetts
Historians from Minnesota
Historians of English literature
Humor researchers
Irony theorists
Jewish American academics
Jewish American historians
Jewish American non-fiction writers
Jewish American writers
Literacy and society theorists
Modernist writers
Trope theorists
Members of the American Philosophical Society